In applied mathematics, test functions, known as artificial landscapes, are useful to evaluate characteristics of optimization algorithms, such as:

 Convergence rate.
 Precision.
 Robustness.
 General performance.

Here some test functions are presented with the aim of giving an idea about the different situations that optimization algorithms have to face when coping with these kinds of problems. In the first part, some objective functions for single-objective optimization cases are presented. In the second part, test functions with their respective Pareto fronts for multi-objective optimization problems (MOP) are given.

The artificial landscapes presented herein for single-objective optimization problems are taken from Bäck, Haupt et al. and from Rody Oldenhuis software. Given the number of problems (55 in total), just a few are presented here.

The test functions used to evaluate the algorithms for MOP were taken from Deb, Binh et al. and Binh. The software developed by Deb can be downloaded, which implements the NSGA-II procedure with GAs, or the program posted on Internet, which implements the NSGA-II procedure with ES.

Just a general form of the equation, a plot of the objective function, boundaries of the object variables and the coordinates of global minima are given herein.

Test functions for single-objective optimization

Test functions for constrained optimization

Test functions for multi-objective optimization

See also 

 Ackley function
 Himmelblau's function
 Rastrigin function
 Rosenbrock function
 Shekel function
 Binh function

References

Constraint programming
Convex optimization
Types of functions